Petro Chevhun (2 June 1926 – 4 June 1999) was a Ukrainian middle-distance runner. He competed in the men's 800 metres at the 1952 Summer Olympics, representing the Soviet Union.

References

1926 births
1999 deaths
Athletes (track and field) at the 1952 Summer Olympics
Ukrainian male middle-distance runners
Soviet male middle-distance runners
Olympic athletes of the Soviet Union
Sportspeople from Kyiv